Slices is a hardcore punk band from Pittsburgh, Pennsylvania. The band includes lead vocalist Greg Kamerdze, guitarist John Kasunic, bassist Mike Kasunic, and drummer Mike Ovens. Formed as a duo in 2004 by brothers John Kasunic and Mike Kasunic,  the band has released music on Iron Lung Records, Kemado Records, and Home Invasion Records.

Discography

LPs 

Cruising (Iron Lung Records, 2010)
Still Cruising (Iron Lung Records, 2012)

EPs 

Untitled (16OH Records, 2009)
Untitled (Home Invasion Records, 2009)
Modern Bride/Chump Change (Kemado Records, 2011)

References 

Hardcore punk groups from Pennsylvania
Musical groups from Pittsburgh